Events from the year 1148 in Ireland.

Incumbents
High King: Toirdelbach Ua Conchobair

Events
 Baltinglass Abbey founded by the Cistercians in Baltinglass

Deaths
Death of Saint Malachy in Clairvaux, on his second journey to Rome.

References